Associação Desportiva Pontassolense is a Portuguese football club based in Ponta do Sol, Madeira. Founded in 1979, it currently plays in the Madeira Football Association, holding home matches at Campo Municipal Ponta do Sol, with a 3,000-seat capacity.

History
Pontassolense saw the light of day on 27 January 1979, but only began participating in official competitions two years later.

In the early years the club was based in was used to stage Ribeira Brava, Madeira Islands, where one single midweek practice took place. The remaining sessions occurred at Ponta do Sol, which would later become a hotel.

Honours
 Terceira Divisão – Serie Madeira: 1
2011–12
 AF Madeira Championship: 3
1998–99
2013–14
2017–18
 AF Madeira Cup: 1
2011–12

References

External links
Official site 

Football clubs in Portugal
Association football clubs established in 1979
1979 establishments in Portugal